The J/92s is a fixed keel one-design sportsboat. It was built for J/Boats by J/Composites in Europe and is certified for offshore sailing.

Design
The J/92s was designed by Rod Johnstone as an offshore Class B sailboat according to the European Union Recreational Craft Directive.

While the J/92s shares the hull shape and interior layout of the J/92, it has been optimized for racing with masthead spinnakers, a non-overlapping headsail, a deeper keel and a  longer cockpit.

Construction
The hull is made from a balsa-GRP sandwich laminate with uniaxial and bidirectional cloths. It is molded in one piece. The deck is made from a fiberglass-balsa sandwich laminate. The keel is bolted to the hull, with the help of a stainless steel backing plate which is then laminated with epoxy to the hull. The bowsprit is made of carbon fiber. The rudder is made from GRP on an F16Ph stainless steel rudder stock.

References

External links

Keelboats
2000s sailboat type designs
Sailboat type designs by Rod Johnstone
Sailboat types built in France
Sailboat types built by J/Boats